Blessed Rainy Day is the holiday marking the end of the monsoon season in Bhutan.  On this day all natural water resources in the country are considered to be sanctifying and citizens are encouraged to take an outdoor bath to be cleansed of "bad deeds, obstructions and defilements" and accumulated bad karma.  Families traditionally gather for a meal of thup (porridge) at breakfast time.  The holiday also marks the end of the farming season and the  beginning of the harvest season.

Government offices, schools, and institutions are closed for the day.

The most auspicious hour for the ablution is determined by astrologers in the service of the Je Khenpo, the chief abbot of the country. They refer to the Bhutanese lunar calendar (essentially the Tibetan lunar calendar), but the exact method of their calculations have not been disclosed.  In 2004, they determined the preferred time to be 4:00 p.m., September 22.  Citizens who are unable to bathe at the exact hour instead often rise before dawn for a brisk morning splash.

Variant romanizations of the Dzongkha name of the holiday include Thrue-Bab, Thrie-Bab, and Thri-Bab. The holiday was dropped from public holiday list in 2007. The Bhutan home minister restored the holiday in 2008. People would still take the day off even when its status was non-official.

The 2017 date is September 22.

References

External links
 A 12-year-old Bhutanese boy writes about Blessed Rainy Day

Public holidays in Bhutan
September observances

Observances set by the Tibetan calendar